The 2020 Washington Huskies men's soccer team represented the University of Washington during the 2020 NCAA Division I men's soccer season. They were led by tenth year head coach Jamie Clark.

Effects of the Covid-19 Pandemic 
On August 13, 2020, the Pac-12 Conference postponed all fall sports through the end of the calendar year.

On November 4, 2020, the NCAA approved a plan for college soccer to be played in the spring.

Player movement

Departures

2020 MLS Draft

2021 MLS Draft

Recruits

Roster 
Source:

Matches

Regular season

Postseason

NCAA Tournament

References 

Washington
2020
Washington Huskies
Washington Huskies
Washington Huskies men's soccer